Louisiana Highway 433 (LA 433) is a state highway in Louisiana that serves St. Tammany Parish.   It spans  in a west to east direction.  It is known at various points as Thompson Road, Bayou Liberty Road, Pontchartrain Drive, Old Spanish Trail, and Rigolets Road.

Route description
From the west, LA 433 begins at a junction with U.S. Route 190 (US 190) near the North Shore Square mall and heads south. At this point, the roadway is also known as Thompson Road. As the road nears downtown Slidell, it crosses Bayou Bonfouca via a drawbridge and becomes a four-lane divided highway. Shortly thereafter, the road joins US 11 and heads southward for about a quarter of a mile before departing eastward along the Old Spanish Trail. LA 433 then intersects Interstate 10 via a diamond interchange (exit 263). Afterward it narrows to two lanes and winds through the swamps of southeast St. Tammany Parish. Heading southeastward, the highway is duly known as Rigolets Road and the Old Spanish Trail at this point. LA 433 ends at a junction with US 90 just north of the Rigolets.

LA 433 is an undivided, two-lane highway from US 190 to US 11. The route then widens to an undivided, five-lane roadway (with a middle turning lane) while concurrent with US 11.  LA 433 narrows slightly to a divided, four-lane road from US 11 to just east of I-10. From just east of I-10 to its terminus at US 90, LA 433 is an undivided, two-lane highway.

Major junctions

External links

External links

LADOTD Official Control Section Map - District 62
Eastern St. Tammany Parish Highway Map
Louisiana State Highway Log

0433
Transportation in St. Tammany Parish, Louisiana
Slidell, Louisiana